Cocineros argentinos is an Argentine Cooking show, hosted by Guillermo Calabrese. It is aired at the TV pública channel since 2009. It won the 2013 Tato award as best TV program of services.

References

External links
 Official site 

Cooking television series
Televisión Pública original programming
2009 Argentine television series debuts